Michael Greenfield (born 15 April 1963) is an American former owner-driver in the CART series. Born in Whitestone, New York. In 1985, his first season of SCCA Formula Atlantic racing, Michael finished 2nd in the SCCA National Championship Run Offs at Road Atlanta. During the years 1986 and 1987 he competed in the ECAR Formula Atlantic Championship with a total of 5 wins, finishing 3rd in points in 1987. He made 6 Indy Lights starts in 1988 with Chip Ganassi Racing with one win on his series debut at Pocono. In 1989, with Bettenhausen Racing's 1987 Lola chassis, he attempted to qualify for the Indianapolis 500 but failed to do so, as did teammate Tony Bettenhausen. The same year at the Pocono Raceway event Michael crashed heavily in practice, failing to qualify there as well. In 1990, teamed with his father Peter, they placed first in the Camel Lights division at the 24 Hours of Daytona. He also returned to the CART series that year with a 1987 Lola chassis and competed in 7 races, his career-best finish of 12th coming in at the Meadowlands race. He also ran two more races with Dale Coyne Racing and competed in the 24 Hours of Daytona in 1991, then returned in 1994 and 1995 to attempt to qualify for the Indy 500 with a 1993 Lola powered by a pushrod V8 engine designed and built by his father Peter. In 1994 Michael was not able to complete rookie orientation and the team was forced to hire Johnny Parsons to drive the car, however, it never came up to speed and they did not make a qualifying attempt. In 1995 Michael took over driving duties but again failed to make a qualifying attempt. The team could not get up to speed due to a major reduction of turbo boost for the pushrod V-8s.

Racing record

Complete International Formula 3000 results
(key) (Races in bold indicate pole position) (Races 
in italics indicate fastest lap)

American open–wheel racing results
(key)

Indy Lights

CART

References

External links
Statistics at ChampCarStats.com

1963 births
24 Hours of Daytona drivers
Atlantic Championship drivers
Champ Car drivers
Indy Lights drivers
International Formula 3000 drivers
Living people
Racing drivers from New York City
Sportspeople from Queens, New York
People from Whitestone, Queens

Dale Coyne Racing drivers
Bettenhausen Racing drivers